∆ may refer to:
 Triangle (∆), one of the basic shapes in geometry. Many different mathematical equations include the use of the triangle.
 Delta (letter) (Δ), a Greek letter also used in mathematics and computer science
 Delta baryon (Δ), one of several Baryons consisting of up and down quarks.
 alt-J (Δ), a British indie band
 Laplace operator (Δ), a differential operator
 Increment operator (∆)
 Symmetric difference, in mathematics, the set of elements which are in either of two sets and not in their intersection